The 31st International Film Festival of India was held from 10-20 January 2000 in New Delhi. The competitive edition was restricted to "Asian Directors". The follow up 32nd IFFI edition was cancelled due to interim decision.

Winners
Golden Peacock (Best Film):  Karunam" by Jayaraj (Indian film)"The Railroad Man"by Yasuo Furuhata  (Japanese film)
Silver Peacock Award for the Most Promising Asian Director: "Nang Nak" (Indonesia, Nonzee Nimibutr) 
Silver Peacock Special Jury Award: "Postmen in the Mountains" by Huo Jianqi (China)

International Jury
Mrinal Sen
Abbas Kiarostami
Joao Batista de Andrade
Joan Dupont
Jean Claude Carriere

References

2000 film festivals
International Film Festival of India
2000 in Indian cinema